Radio Bilingüe is a non-profit public radio network with Latino control and leadership, is the only United States national distributor of public radio programming in the Spanish language. It is based in Fresno, California.

This satellite network was formed to provide stations with news, information, and cultural programming in Spanish and musical programs showcasing a variety of Latino formats with emphasis on Mexican folk and Afro-Caribbean rhythms. Satélite Radio Bilingüe builds on Radio Bilingüe's decades-old tradition of talk programs, special events coverage and its flagship news service, Noticiero Latino, for stations across the United States, Puerto Rico and Mexico.

Radio Bilingüe is the recognized Spanish-language radio service for the public radio system in the United States. It serves over half a million listeners with its pioneering daily Spanish-language national talk show, Línea Abierta, its independently produced news service, Noticiero Latino, and its rainbow of Spanish-language folk music for its national Latino audiences. The entire 24-hour daily operation is totally devoted to public service. Radio Bilingüe has a full-time staff of twenty-five and a budget of two million dollars. Its funders include the Robert Wood Johnson Foundation, The California Endowment, the David and Lucile Packard Foundation, the Corporation for Public Broadcasting, the National Endowment for the Arts, the California Arts Council, the California State Health Department - Tobacco Control Section, and many other funding partners interested in informing hard-to-reach, low-income, Latino populations in California and across the U.S.

History
Founded in 1976 by Hugo Morales along with Latino activists, farmworkers, and community members, Radio Bilingüe (RB) became the first full-power FM radio station to provide media access and culturally and socially relevant news and information to the growing Spanish-speaking community of California’s Central Valley. RB is a non-profit, educational, public radio network aimed at serving primarily underserved and underrepresented Latinos, as well as to other minority communities, living in the United States.

Radio Bilingüe became formally incorporated in July 1977 when its articles of incorporation were signed. Two years later, on August 20, 1979, the Federal Communications Commission (FCC) approved Radio Bilingüe's application for its first station, KSJV 91.5 FM in Fresno. The radio station's first broadcast took place on July 4, 1980; but it wasn’t until August 5, 1980, that the FCC legally granted Radio Bilingüe its noncommercial educational FM station license.

Radio Bilingüe’s first home was on the fourth floor of the Mason Building of the Fulton Mall in downtown Fresno. Its 16,000-watt transmitter, located on Eshom Point in the Sierra Nevada, had the capacity to reach the Chicano and Mexican community living in the Central Valley of California between the cities of Merced and Bakersfield. Radio Bilingüe began featuring public-affairs shows focusing on farmworker issues in addition to musical content. The station would also broadcast forums and call-in shows on various topics, such as immigration reform, pesticides, labor law, and bilingual education. At the time of its establishment, Radio Bilingüe became the first bilingual public radio station in a major market and the third bilingual station in the United States.

In the early 1990s, Radio Bilingüe experienced a development that marked a major expansion for the organization: it launched Satélite Radio Bilingüe, which enabled satellite transmission of its programming throughout the United States. This meant the radio station could reach many more of the Latino communities living across rural and urban areas in the country. In addition to the expanded U.S. coverage, Radio Bilingüe also began reaching Latino communities in Puerto Rico, in various states across Mexico, and in Vancouver, Canada.

Across the United States, Radio Bilingüe constitutes about one-third of the national Latino public radio system. In California, it serves three rural regions with concentrated Latino populations: the San Joaquin Valley, Imperial County, and the combined Monterey/Santa Cruz/San Benito County area. The largest of Radio Bilingüe’s service regions is the San Joaquin Valley; this area stretches from Stanislaus County in the north to Kern County in the south. In 2002, the San Joaquin Valley's various radio markets combined ranked as the seventh-largest Hispanic radio market in the country (Arbitron, 2002). Considering all three of its service regions, Radio Bilingüe would rank as the sixth-largest Hispanic broadcaster in the United States, reaching more than 1 million teens and adults living in Spanish-speaking households across the United States.

Today, Radio Bilingüe's main office is headquartered in Fresno, California, and its news division office is located in Oakland, California. In the course of 34 years since its first broadcast, Radio Bilingüe grew from a single radio station with local reach, into a transnational radio network. As of 2014, Radio Bilingüe owns and operates 13 radio stations in Arizona, California, New Mexico, and Texas. Radio Bilingüe also has 9 repeater stations and 92 affiliate radio stations across the United States, Canada, and Puerto Rico (the number of affiliate stations may vary year to year).

References

External links
 

Afro-Caribbean culture in the United States
Hispanic and Latino American culture in California
Mexican-American culture in California
Spanish-language radio stations in California
1976 establishments in California
Organizations based in Fresno, California